The Madeira pipistrelle (Pipistrellus maderensis) is a species of vesper bat. It is endemic to Azores, Madeira and the Canary Islands.

References

Pipistrellus
Taxa named by George Edward Dobson
Bats of Africa
Bats of Europe
Fauna of Madeira
Mammals of the Canary Islands
Vulnerable animals
Vulnerable biota of Africa
Vulnerable biota of Europe
Mammals described in 1878
Taxonomy articles created by Polbot